Live in Concert 1977 & 1979 is a double live album by the English hard rock band Bad Company, released on CD and as an mp3 download in 2016. It is an archival album with recordings taken from two concerts from their tours in 1977 and 1979. Disc one contains material from a concert at The Summit in Houston, Texas on May 23, 1977. Disc 2 contains material from a concert at Wembley Arena in London on March 9, 1979.

Track listing

Disc One 
Recorded on May 23, 1977 at The Summit in Houston, Texas
"Burnin' Sky" (Paul Rodgers)
"Too Bad" (Mick Ralphs)
"Ready for Love" (Ralphs)
"Heartbeat" (Rodgers)
"Morning Sun" (Rodgers)
"Man Needs Woman" (Rodgers)
"Leaving You" (Rodgers)
"Shooting Star" (Rodgers)
"Simple Man" (Ralphs)
"Movin' On" (Ralphs)
"Like Water" (Rodgers, Machiko Shimizu)
Drum solo (Simon Kirke)
"Live for the Music" (Ralphs)
"Good Lovin' Gone Bad" (Ralphs)
"Feel Like Makin' Love" (Ralphs, Rodgers)

Disc Two 
Recorded on March 9, 1979 at Wembley Arena in London except "Hey Joe" recorded on June 26, 1979 at the Capital Centre near Washington, D.C.
"Bad Company" (Kirke, Rodgers)
"Gone, Gone, Gone" (Boz Burrell)
"Shooting Star" (Rodgers)
"Rhythm Machine" (Burrell, Kirke)
"Oh, Atlanta" (Ralphs)
"She Brings Me Love" (Rodgers)
"Run with the Pack" (Rodgers)
"Evil Wind" (Rodgers)
Drum solo (Kirke)
"Honey Child" (Burrell, Kirke, Ralphs, Rodgers)
"Rock Steady" (Rodgers)
"Rock 'n' Roll Fantasy" (Rodgers)
"Hey Joe" (Billy Roberts)
"Feel Like Makin' Love" (Ralphs, Rodgers)
"Can't Get Enough" (Ralphs)

Personnel
Paul Rodgers – vocals, piano, guitar, harmonica
Mick Ralphs – lead guitar, piano, background vocals
Boz Burrell – bass
Simon Kirke – drums

References

Bad Company albums
2016 live albums
Rhino Records live albums